Puchalski (feminine: Puchalska; plural: Puchalscy) is a Polish surname. It may refer to:

 Jan and Anna Puchalski, Polish Righteous Among Nations
 Stanisław Puchalski (1867–1931), Polish general
 Włodzimierz Puchalski (1908–1979), Polish photographer

See also
 

Polish-language surnames